Niko Bellotto is a solo electronic music producer and Dj since late 80s and member of the electronic tango-infused band, Baires. Half-Swedish and Argentinian, Bellotto was born in Sweden and raised in both, Spain, Sweden and  Argentina His career spans three decades, first introduced into the electronic field in the early 1980s as a DJ.  He subtly blends a variety of styles ranging from house music, tech-house, and rare grooves.

Bellotto created and managed the critically acclaimed Tangent Beats record label based in Stockholm, which has released material from such notable artists as Alexi Delano, Casey Hogan, John Dahlback, and Håkan Lidbo. In 2001 and 2002, he was nominated for two Grammys for his production skills in electronic music and is in demand internationally as a DJ, producer and remixer.  With dozens of 12-inch singles, collaborations, and remixes to his credit many  which have been released under such esteemed record labels as Defected, Plastic City, Suburbia, Loop, Route 33 as well as his own imprint, Tangent Beats.Currently managing the Eat My House Label featuring his own productions and Music from Sebastian Gudding, Özgür Can, Jusso Pikanen ....

2003 He started the Band Baires with fellow DJ and producer, Juan Fernando Maguid (also known under monikers DJ Djablo, Detonator, and Alta Fuse Collective). Baires is a 5-piece live band experimenting with electronic elements, jazz, and tango music stemming from their Argentinian roots. Their new album, Exilio was released September 2005.

Discography

albums
baires / exilio / tangent beats
purobeach vol 3 / seamless recordings
purobeach vol 4 / seamless recordings
puro desert lounge vol 1 / seamless recordings
puro desert lounge vol 2 / seamless recordings

Singles EPs

Niko Bellotto & Dick Track/World Club EP/Loop Rec
Adam Beyer & Niko Bellotto/The Pump EP/Primate Rec
Niko Bellotto & Gol/State Of Mind EP/Plastic City
Niko Bellotto/Conesa/Suburbia/Plastic City
Niko Bellotto & Pawel Kobak/More Than You Know EP/Tangent Beats
Håkan Lidbo & Niko Bellotto/From Stockholm With Love EP/Tangent Beats
Martin Venetjoky & Niko Bellotto/Jazzed EP/Tangent Beats
Baires / Baires EP / Tangent Beats
Baires / Exilio (Album) Tangent Beats
Niko Bellotto Feat Aural / My Definition EP / Tangent Beats
Niko Bellotto / gw anthem / white and white

Remixes
Håkan Lidbo / What Is Love (Temperamento Mix)
Penguin Republic / The 9 / (Nb's Straight 2 The 4 Rmx)Tangent Beats
John Dahlbäck / Parken / Niko Bellotto remix / Tangent Beats
Pawel Kobak Feat Maria Angelli (Niko Bellotto Rmx)Route 33
Alcazar / We keep on rocking (Bellotto and Cabrera club mix)
Sash and vincent inc / 50 ways (Bellotto and Holmberg remix) Manuscript recordings
Elin Lanto / love made me stupid (addictive + addictive dub remixes) catchy tunes
Paula Lobos /
Meja / butterflies / Sony music
Martin Stenmarck / Las Vegas
Laleh / Colors
Sebastian Gudding / Zinken
Sebastian Gudding /

Remixed By
Dimitri From Paris (Niko Bellotto & Pawel Kobak/Love For You) Defected
Pete Moss (Trumpet Jam) Test 542
Alexkid (Baires Theme) Tangent Beats
Ben Wijay (Baires Theme) Tangent Beats
Martin Venetjoky (Latin Impressions) Tangent Beats
Morgan Page ( Love for you ) Tangent Beats
Aural ( Love for you ) Tangent Beats
Alexi Delano ( Love for you ) Tangent Beats
Joel Mull ( trumpet jam ) Tangent Beats
Sebastian Gudding ( Sunshine ) Eat My House

External links 

Niko Bellotto discography on discogs.com
Niko Bellotto on epitonic.com

Year of birth missing (living people)
Living people
Spanish electronic musicians